Mudiad Amddiffyn Cymru (Movement for the Defence of Wales), abbreviated as MAC, was a paramilitary Welsh nationalist organisation, which was responsible for a number of bombing incidents between 1963 and 1969. The group's activities primarily targeted infrastructure carrying water to the English city of Liverpool.

MAC was initially set up in response to the flooding of the Afon Tryweryn valley and the village of Capel Celyn to provide water for Liverpool. Its founders were Owain Williams, John Albert Jones and Emyr Llewelyn Jones. On 10 February 1963 a transformer at the dam construction site was blown up by three men, of whom one, Emyr Llywelyn Jones, was identified, convicted and sentenced to one year imprisonment. MAC blew up an electricity pylon at Gellilydan on the day of his conviction. This led to the arrest and conviction of Owain Williams and John Albert Jones.

The leadership of the organisation was later taken over by John Barnard Jenkins, a former non-commissioned officer in the British Army's Royal Army Medical Corps. Under his leadership, MAC was suspected by British police to have been behind the bombing of the Clywedog dam construction site in 1966. In 1967 a pipe carrying water from Lake Vyrnwy to Liverpool was blown up. Later the same year MAC exploded a bomb at the Temple of Peace and Health in Cardiff's civic centre, close to a venue which was to be used for a conference to discuss the Investiture of Prince Charles as Prince of Wales. In 1968 a tax office in Cardiff was blown up, followed the same year by the Welsh Office building in the same city, then another water pipe at Helsby, Cheshire. In April 1969 a tax office in Chester was the next target. On 30 June 1969, the evening before the investiture, two members of MAC, Alwyn Jones and George Taylor, were killed when a bomb they had been placing near government offices exploded prematurely.  On the day of the investiture, two other bombs were planted in Caernarfon, one in the local police constable's garden which exploded as the 21 gun salute was fired. Another was planted in an iron forge near the castle. It failed to go off when intended. It then lay undiscovered for several days before seriously injuring a 10-year-old boy who discovered the device. The final bomb was placed on Llandudno Pier and was designed to stop the Royal Yacht Britannia from docking - this too failed to explode.   In November 1969 John Jenkins was arrested, and in April 1970 was convicted of eight offences involving explosives and sentenced to ten years' imprisonment. In an interview shown on the BBC2 4 July 2009, John Jenkins repeated his intention that the bombs were never planted or timed to hurt people but just to disrupt the ceremony. Although there were further bombings, there is no evidence that MAC were involved.

See also
 Free Wales Army

Further reading
Roy Clews (1980), To Dream of Freedom (Y Lolfa) 
John Humphries (2008), Freedom Fighters, Wales's Forgotten War 1963–1993
Wyn Thomas (2013), Hands Off Wales: Nationhood and Militancy, (Gomer) 
Dr Wyn Thomas (2019), John Jenkins: The Reluctant Revolutionary? (Y Lolfa)

References

Political organisations based in Wales
Welsh nationalism
Republicanism in Wales
Republicanism in the United Kingdom
Terrorism in Wales